Pauline Murray and the Invisible Girls (sometimes called Untitled) is the only album made by Penetration singer Pauline Murray and the Invisible Girls, John Cooper Clarke's backing band. It was released in September 1980 on the RSO label.

Alongside core members Martin Hannett on bass and record production, Steve Hopkins on keyboards and Paul Burgess on drums, the band included several musicians from other Manchester bands: The Durutti Column's Vini Reilly and Dave Rowbotham on guitar, John Maher from Buzzcocks on drums, Dave Hassell on percussion and Murray's boyfriend Robert Blamire on bass. Like Murray, Blamire had been a member of Penetration until it dissolved in late 1979. With Blamire in the band, Hannett moved from bass to keyboards.

Track listing

Original LP content 
All tracks composed by Pauline Murray and Robert Blamire; except where indicated

Side one 
 "Screaming in the Darkness"
 "Dream Sequence 1"
 "European Eyes"
 "Shoot You Down"
 "Sympathy"
 "Time Slipping" (Martin Hannett, Steve Hopkins)

Side two 
 "Drummer Boy"
 "Thundertunes"
 "When Will We Learn"
 "Mr. X"
 "Judgement Day"

1993 CD reissue 
The three songs from the single "Searching For Heaven" are included as bonus tracks.
 "Screaming in the Darkness" – 3:36
 "Dream Sequence 1" – 3:19
 "European Eyes" – 3:20
 "Shoot You Down" – 2:07
 "Sympathy" – 2:47
 "Time Slipping" – 4:04
 "Drummer Boy" – 3:03
 "Thundertunes" – 3:23
 "When Will We Learn" – 3:35
 "Mr. X" – 4:27
 "Judgement Day" – 4:25
 "The Visitor" – 3:44
 "Animal Crazy" – 3:16
 "Searching for Heaven" – 2:59
The version of "Dream Sequence 1" on this CD differs from the one on the original vinyl release. It may be a completely different take or possibly a different vocal recording over the same backing.

Singles 
"Dream Sequences", 7", 10", Illusive Records, 1980, IVEX1
"Dream Sequence I"
"Dream Sequence II"

Produced and arranged by the Invisible Girls including Martin Hannett, Robert Blamire, Steve Hopkins, with thanks to Alan Rawlings
Published by Quarry Music.
Cover by Peter Saville and Trevor Key
Released through RSO Records Limited

"Mr. X", 7", Illusive Records, 1980, IVE2
"Mr. X"
"Two Shots"

Written by Pauline Murray and Robert Blamire
Recorded in the Big Room
Mixing – Martin Hannett
Produced and arranged by the Invisible Girls
Released through RSO Records Limited

"Searching for Heaven", 7", 10", Illusive Records, 1981, IVEX3
"Searching for Heaven" (Murray, Blamire, Wayne Hussey)
"Animal Crazy" (Murray)
"The Visitor" (Murray)

Bass – Robert Blamire
Keyboards – Steve Hopkins
Guitar – Wayne Hussey
Drums – John Maher
Uncredited guitar – Bernard Sumner on "Searching for Heaven" 
Producer – Martin Hannett
Photography – Sheila Rock
Design – Martyn Atkins
Cover – Peter Saville and Trevor Key
Thanks also to Alan Rawlings
Published by Quarry Music
Released through RSO Records Limited

Wayne Hussey had been recruited via a Melody Maker advertisement at the end of 1980 and Martin Hannett recruited Bernard Sumner to execute the guitar solo in "Searching for Heaven" as New Order were waiting to use the studio.

Personnel 
Pauline Murray – lead vocals
The Invisible Girls
Robert Blamire – bass
Martin Hannett – keyboards, producer
Steve Hopkins – keyboards, producer
Vini Reilly – "special guest" guitar
John Maher – drums
Paul Burgess – drums
Dave Rowbotham – guitar
Dave Hassell – percussion
Alan Rawlings – guitar (only 12)
Wayne Hussey – guitar (only 12 and 13)
Bernard Sumner – guitar (only 14)
Technical
Chris Nagle – engineer

References 

1980 debut albums
Albums produced by Martin Hannett
RSO Records albums